The Unified Team at the 1992 Summer Olympics in Barcelona, Spain, was a joint team consisting of twelve of the fifteen former Soviet Union republics that chose to compete together. Previously Soviet-occupied Estonia, Latvia, and Lithuania competed separately. The team has been informally called the Commonwealth of Independent States team, though Georgia was not yet a member of the CIS when it competed as part of the Unified Team. It competed under the IOC country code EUN (from the French ). A total of 475 competitors, 310 men and 165 women, took part in 234 events in 27 sports.

The team finished first in the medal rankings, edging its old rival the USA 45 to 37 in gold medals, and 112 to 108 in total medals.

The Unified Team's only other appearance was at the 1992 Winter Olympics.

Members

Medals by summer sport

Medalists

Competitors
The following is the list of number of competitors in the Games.

Archery

The women earned two bronze medals, one from Natalia Valeeva's individual performance and another from the team competition. In the men's competition, however, defending bronze medallist Vladimir Echeev fell in the round of 16 along with one of the other male Unified Team members, while Vadim Chikarev advanced to the quarterfinal before being defeated.

Women's Individual Competition:
 Natalia Valeeva – Bronze Medal Match (→  Bronze Medal), 4–1
 Khatouna Kvrivishvili – Quarterfinal, 6th place (2–1)
 Lyudmila Arzhannikova – Round of 32, 27th place (0–1)

Men's Individual Competition:
 Vadim Chikarev – Quarterfinal, 7th place (2–1)
 Stanislav Zabrodski – Round of 16, 10th place (1–1)
 Vladimir Echeev – Round of 16, 11th place (1–1)

Women's Team Competition:
 Valeeva, Kvrivishvili, and Arzhannikova – Bronze Medal Match (→  Bronze Medal), 3–1

Men's Team Competition:
 Chikarev, Zabrodski, and Echeev – Quarterfinal, 8th place

Athletics

Men's Competition
Men's 5.000 metres
 Andrey Tikhonov
 Heat — 13:44.67 (→ did not advance)

Men's 10.000 metres
 Oleg Strizhakov
 Heat — 28:35.97 (→ did not advance)

Men's 4 × 400 m Relay
 Dmitry Kosov, Dmitry Kliger, Dmitry Golovastov, and Oleh Tverdokhlib
 Heat — 3:05.59 (→ did not advance)

Men's Marathon
 Yakov Tolstikov — 2:17.04 (→ 22nd place)

Men's 400 m Hurdles
 Oleh Tverdokhlib
 Heat — 48.68
 Semifinal — 49.11
 Final — 48.63 (→ 6th place)
 Vadim Zadoynov
 Heat — 51.21 (→ did not advance)

Men's 20 km Walk
 Mikhail Shchennikov — 1:27:17 (→ 12th place)
 Vladimir Andreyev — 1:28:25 (→ 13th place)
 Oleg Trochin — did not finish (→ no ranking)

Men's 50 km Walk
 Andrey Perlov — 3:50:13 (→  Gold Medal)
 Valeriy Spitsyn — 3:54:39 (→ 4th place)
 Aleksandr Potashev  — DSQ (→ no ranking)

Men's Long Jump
 Dmitriy Bagryanov
 Qualification — 8.09 m
 Final — 7.98 m (→ 7th place)
 Vadim Ivanov
 Qualification — 5.97 m (→ did not advance)

Men's triple jump
 Leonid Voloshin
 Qualification — 17.21 m
 Final — 17.32 m (→ 4th place)
 Aleksandr Kovalenko
 Qualification — 16.93 m
 Final — 17.06 m (→ 7th place)
 Vasiliy Sokov
 Qualification — 16.91 m
 Final — 16.86 m (→ 9th place)

Men's Javelin Throw
 Andrey Shevchuk
 Qualification — 80.22 m
 Final — 77.74 m (→ 8th place)
 Viktor Zaitsev
 Qualification — 79.12 m (→ did not advance)
 Dmitriy Polyunin
 Qualification — 76.40 m (→ did not advance)

Men's Hammer Throw
 Andrey Abduvaliyev
 Qualification — 78.82 m
 Final — 82.54 m (→  Gold Medal)
 Igor Astapkovich
 Qualification — 76.50 m
 Final — 81.96 m (→  Silver Medal)
 Igor Nikulin
 Qualification — 79.08 m
 Final — 81.38 m (→  Bronze Medal)

Men's Shot Put
 Vyacheslav Lykho
 Qualification — 20.24 m
 Final — 20.94 m (→  Bronze Medal)
 Aleksandr Klimenko
 Qualification — 20.16 m
 Final — 20.23 m (→ 8th place)
 Andrey Nemchninov
 Qualification — 18.98 m (→ did not advance)

Men's Discus Throw
 Dmitriy Kovtsun
 Qualification — 61.62 m
 Final — 62.04 m (→ 7th place)
 Dmitriy Shevchenko
 Qualification — 60.22 m
 Final — 61.78 m (→ 8th place)
 Volodymyr Zinchenko
 Qualification — 56.94 m (→ did not advance)

Women's Competition
Women's 800 metres
 Lilia Nurutdinova
 Heat — 2:00.37
 Semifinal — 1:58.04
 Final — 1:55.99 (→  Silver Medal)
 Inna Yevseyeva
 Heat — 1:58.58
 Semifinal — 1:58.20
 Final — 1:57.20 (→ 4th place)
 Lyubov Gurina
 Heat — 2:00.27
 Semifinal — 2:00.64
 Final — 1:58.13 (→ 8th place)

Women's 10.000 metres
 Lyudmila Matveyeva
 Heat — 33:23.02 (→ did not advance)
 Yelena Zhupiyeva-Vyazova
 Heat — did not finish (→ did not advance)
 Olga Bondarenko
 Heat — did not finish (→ did not advance)

Women's 400 m Hurdles
 Tatyana Ledovskaya
 Heat — 55.03
 Semifinal — 54.53
 Final — 54.31 (→ 4th place)
 Vera Ordina
 Heat — 55.25
 Semifinal — 54.37
 Final — 54.83 (→ 5th place)
 Margarita Ponomaryova
 Heat — 55.36
 Semifinal — 53.98
 Final — 54.83 (→ 6th place)

Women's 10 km Walk
 Yelena Nikolayeva
 Final – 44:33 (→  Silver Medal)
 Yelena Sayko
 Final – 45:23 (→ 8th place)
 Alina Ivanova
 Final — DSQ (→ no ranking)

Women's Marathon
 Valentina Yegorova — 2:32.41 (→  Gold Medal)
 Ramilya Burangulova — 2:38.46 (→ 8th place)
 Madina Biktagirova — disqualified

Women's Long Jump
 Inessa Kravets
 Heat — 6.79 m
 Final — 7.12 m (→  Silver Medal)
 Irina Mushailova
 Heat — 6.86 m
 Final — 6.68 m (→ 5th place)

Women's High Jump
 Olga Turchak
 Qualification — 1.92 m
 Final — 1.83 m (→ 13th place)
 Tatyana Shevchik
 Qualification — 1.92 m
 Final — 1.83 m (→ 16th place)
 Olga Bolchova
 Qualification — 1.83 m (→ did not advance)

Women's Javelin Throw
 Natalya Shikolenko
 Heat — 67.36m
 Final — 68.26m (→  Silver Medal)
 Yelena Svezhentseva
 Heat — 60.44m
 Final — 57.32m (→ 9th place)
 Irina Kostyuchenkova
 Heat — 57.96 (→ 20th place)

Women's Discus Throw
 Larisa Korotkevich
 Heat — 67.62m
 Final — 65.52m (→ 4th place)
 Olga Burova
 Heat — 64.68m
 Final — 64.02m (→ 5th place)
 Irina Yatchenko
 Heat — 61.60m
 Final — 63.74m (→ 7th place)

Badminton

Basketball

Men's team competition
 Preliminary round (group B)
 Defeated Venezuela (78–64)
 Defeated Australia (85–63)
 Defeated PR China (100–84)
 Defeated Lithuania (92–80)
 Lost to Puerto Rico (70–82)
 Quarterfinals
 Defeated Germany (83–76)
 Semifinals
 Lost to Croatia (74–75)
 Bronze Medal Match
 Lost to Lithuania (78–82) → 4th place

 Team roster
 Sergey Bazarevich
 Aleksandr Volkov
 Aleksandr Belostenny
 Dmitry Sukharev
 Elchad Gadashev
 Gundars Vētra
 Igors Miglenieks
 Sergey Panov
 Valery Tikhonenko
 Viktor Berezhnoy
 Vitaly Nosov
 Vladimir Gorin

Women's Team Competition
 Preliminary round (group A)
 Lost to Cuba (89–91)
 Defeated Italy (79–67)
 Defeated Brazil (76–64)
 Semifinals
 Defeated United States (79–73)
 Final
 Defeated PR China (76–66) →  Gold Medal

 Team roster
 Yelena Baranova
 Elen Bunatyants
 Irina Gerlits
 Yelena Khudashova
 Irina Minkh
 Yelena Shvaybovich
 Irina Sumnikova
 Marina Tkachenko
 Yelena Tornikidu
 Svetlana Zaboluyeva
 Natalya Zasulskaya
 Yelena Zhirko

Boxing

Men's Light-Flyweight (– 48 kg)
 Vladimir Ganchenko
 First Round — Lost to Pál Lakatos (HUN), RSC-2 (01:27)

Men's Flyweight (– 51 kg)
 Anatoly Filippov
 First Round — Lost to Yacin Chikh (ALG), 3:5

Men's Bantamweight (– 54 kg)
 Vladislav Antonov
 First Round — Lost to Chatree Suwanyod (THA), 4:6

Men's Featherweight (– 57 kg)
 Ramaz Paliani →  Bronze Medal
 First Round — Defeated Julian Wheeler (USA), 8:4
 Second Round — Defeated Rogerio Brito (BRA), 19:2
 Quarterfinals — Defeated Daniel Dumitrescu (ROM), 11:5
 Semifinals — Lost to Faustino Reyes (ESP), 9:14

Men's Lightweight (– 60 kg)
 Artur Grigoryan
 First Round — Defeated Óscar Palomino (ESP), 11:10
 Second Round — Lost to Hong Sung-Sik (KOR), 3:9

Men's Light-Welterweight (– 63.5 kg)
 Oleg Nikolayev
 First Round — Bye
 Second Round — Defeated Hubert Tinge Meta (PNG), 17:2
 Quarterfinals — Lost to Héctor Vinent (CUB), 3:26

Men's Welterweight (– 67 kg)
 Andrey Pestryayev
 First Round — Lost to Vitalijus Karpaciauskas (LTU), 4:9

Men's Light-Middleweight (– 71 kg)
 Arkady Topayev
 First Round — Lost to Juan Carlos Lemus (CUB), 0:11

Men's Middleweight (– 75 kg)
 Aleksandr Lebziak
 First Round — Defeated Justann Crawford (AUS), RSCH-3 (01:56)
 Second Round — Lost to Chris Byrd (USA), 7:16

Men's Light-Heavyweight (– 81 kg)
 Rostislav Zaulichniy →  Silver Medal
 First Round — Bye
 Second Round — Defeated Jacklord Jacobs (NGA), 16:8
 Quarterfinals — Defeated Stephen Wilson (GBR), 13:0
 Semifinals — Defeated Zoltán Béres (HUN), RSC-3 (02:51)
 Final — Lost to Torsten May (GER), 3:8

Men's Heavyweight (– 91 kg)
 Aleksey Chudinov
 First Round — Defeated Vidas Markevičius (LTU), 7:3
 Second Round — Lost to Paul Douglas (IRL), 9:15

Men's Super-Heavyweight (+ 91 kg)
 Nikolay Kulpin
 First Round — Bye
 Second Round — Lost to Larry Donald (USA), RSCI-3 (00:02)

Canoeing

Cycling

Nineteen cyclists, fifteen men and four women, represented the Unified Team in 1992.

Men's road race
 Svyatoslav Ryabushenko
 Petro Koshelenko
 Aleksey Bochkov

Men's team time trial
 Igor Dzyuba
 Oleh Halkin
 Igor Pastukhovich
 Igor Patenko

Men's sprint
 Nikolay Kovsh

Men's 1 km time trial
 Aleksandr Kirichenko

Men's individual pursuit
 Oleksandr Honchenkov

Men's team pursuit
 Valery Batura
 Oleksandr Honchenkov
 Dmitry Nelyubin
 Roman Saprykin
 Nikolay Kuznetsov

Men's points race
 Vasyl Yakovlev

Women's road race
 Natalya Kyschuk — 2:05:03 (→ 4th place)
 Zinaida Stagourskaya — 2:05:03 (→ 16th place)
 Svetlana Samochvalova — did not finish (→ no ranking)

Women's sprint
 Galina Yenyukhina

Women's individual pursuit
 Svetlana Samokhvalova

Diving

Men's 3 m Springboard
 Dmitri Sautin
 Preliminary Round — 384.42 points
 Final — 627.78 points (→  Bronze Medal)
 Valery Statsenko
 Preliminary Round — 388.26 points
 Final — 577.92 points (→ 8th place)

Men's 10 m Platform
 Dmitri Sautin
 Preliminary Round — 389.28 points
Final — 565.95 points (→ 6th place)
 Georgy Chogovadze
 Preliminary Round — 361.47 (→ did not advance, 16th place)

Women's 3 m Springboard
 Irina Lashko
 Preliminary Round — 334.89 points
 Final — 514.14 points (→  Silver Medal)
 Vera Ilyina
 Preliminary Round — 290.46 points
 Final — 470.67 points (→ 6th place)

Women's 10 m Platform
 Yelena Miroshina
 Final — 411.63 points (→  Silver Medal)
 Inga Afonina
 Final — 398.43 points (→ 5th place)

Equestrian

Fencing

20 fencers, 15 men and 5 women represented the Unified Team in 1992.

 Men's foil
 Serhiy Holubytskiy
 Dmitry Shevchenko
 Vyacheslav Grigoryev

 Men's team foil
 Dmitry Shevchenko, Serhiy Holubytskiy, Vyacheslav Grigoryev, Anvar Ibragimov, Ilgar Mamedov

 Men's épée
 Pavel Kolobkov
 Andrey Shuvalov
 Serhiy Kravchuk

 Men's team épée
 Pavel Kolobkov, Andrey Shuvalov, Serhiy Kravchuk, Sergey Kostarev, Valery Zakharevich

 Men's sabre
 Grigory Kiriyenko
 Aleksandr Shirshov
 Heorhiy Pohosov

 Men's team sabre
 Grigory Kiriyenko, Aleksandr Shirshov, Heorhiy Pohosov, Vadym Huttsait, Stanislav Pozdnyakov

 Women's foil
 Tatyana Sadovskaya
 Olga Velichko
 Yelena Glikina

 Women's team foil
 Yelena Glikina, Yelena Grishina, Tatyana Sadovskaya, Olga Velichko, Olga Voshchakina

Gymnastics

Handball

Men's team competition
 Preliminary round (group B)
 Unified team – Germany 25–15
 Unified team – France 23–22
 Unified team – Egypt 22–18
 Unified team – Spain 24–18
 Unified team – Romania 27–25
 Semi Finals
 Unified team – Iceland 23–19
 Final
 Unified team – Sweden 22–20 (→  Gold Medal)

 Team roster
 Andrey Barbashinsky
 Sergey Bebeshko
 Talant Duishebayev
 Dmitry Filipov
 Yuri Gavrilov
 Valery Gopin
 Vyacheslav Gorpixin
 Oleg Grebnev
 Mikhail Yakimovich
 Oleg Kiselyev
 Vasily Kudinov
 Andrey Lavrov
 Andrey Minevski
 Igor Chumak
 Igor Vassiliyev
 Head coach: Spartak Mironvich

Women's Team Competition
 Preliminary round (group A)
 Unified team – United States 23–16
 Unified team – Nigeria 26–18
 Unified team – Germany 28–22
 Semi Finals
 Unified team – Norway 20–23
 Bronze Medal Match
 Unified team – Germany 24–20 (→  Bronze Medal)

 Team roster
 Natalya Anisimova
 Maryna Bazhanova
 Svetlana Bogdanova
 Galina Borzenkova
 Natalya Deryugina
 Tatyana Dzhandzhgava
 Lyudmila Gudz
 Elina Guseva
 Tetyana Horb
 Larissa Kiseleva
 Natalya Morskova
 Galina Onoprienko
 Svetlana Pryakhina
 Head coach: Alexandre Tarassikov

Hockey

Judo

Modern pentathlon

Three male pentathletes represented the Unified Team in 1992. They won silver in the team event and Eduard Zenovka won an individual bronze.

Individual
 Eduard Zenovka
 Anatoly Starostin
 Dmitry Svatkovsky

Team
 Eduard Zenovka, Anatoly Starostin, Dmitry Svatkovsky

Rhythmic gymnastics

Rowing

Rowing events, results, and competitors:

 Men's single sculls – 17th place
 Ihor Mohylniy

 Men's double sculls – 12th place
 Oleksandr Slobodeniuk, Leonid Shaposhnykov

 Men's coxless pair – 15th place
 Yury Pimenov, Nikolay Pimenov

 Men's coxed pair – 11th place
 Valery Belodedov, Dmitry Nos, Anatoly Korbut

 Men's quadruple sculls – 7th place
 Valeriy Dosenko, Sergey Kinyakin, Mykola Chupryna, Girts Vilks

 Men's coxless four – 10th place
 Viktor Pitirimov, Roman Monchenko, Vladimir Sokolov, Vadim Yunash

 Men's coxed four – 6th place
 Veniamin But, Igor Bortnitsky, Vladimir Romanishin, Gennadi Kryuçkin, Pyotr Petrinich

 Men's eight – 10th place
 Vitaliy Raievskiy, Alexandru Britov, Yevgeny Kislyakov, Aleksandr Anikeyev, Sergey Korotkikh, Oleg Sveshnikov, Vasily Tikhonov, Stepan Dmitriyevsky, Igor Shkaberin

 Women's double sculls – 6th place
 Sariya Zakyrova, Inna Frolova

 Women's coxless pair – 8th place
 Hanna Motrechko, Olena Ronzhyna-Morozova

 Women's quadruple sculls – 3rd place ( Bronze medal)
 Yekaterina Khodatovich-Karsten, Antonina Makhina-Dumcheva-Zelikovich, Tetiana Ustiuzhanina, Yelena Khloptseva

 Women's eight – 4th place
 Svitlana Fil, Marina Znak, Irina Gribko, Sarmīte Stone, Marina Suprun, Nataliya Stasyuk, Nataliya Grigoryeva, Yekaterina Kotko, Yelena Medvedeva

Sailing

Women's 470 Class
 Larisa Moskalenko and Alena Pakholchik
 Final Ranking — 43.0 points (→ 4th place)

Shooting

Swimming

Men's 50 m Freestyle
 Alexander Popov
 Heat – 22.21
 Final – 21.91 (→  Gold Medal)
 Gennadiy Prigoda
 Heat – 22.57
 Final – 22.54 (→ 7th place)

Men's 100 m Freestyle
 Alexander Popov
 Heat – 49.29
 Final – 49.02 (→  Gold Medal)
 Gennadiy Prigoda
 Heat – 50.00
 Final – 50.25 (→ 8th place)

Men's 200 m Freestyle
 Yevgeny Sadovyi
 Heat – 1:46.74
 Final – 1:46.70 (→  Gold Medal)
 Vladimir Pyshnenko
 Heat – 1:47.94
 Final – 1:48.32 (→ 5th place)

Men's 400 m Freestyle
 Yevgeny Sadovyi
 Heat – 3:49.37
 Final – 3:45.00 (→  Gold Medal)
 Aleksey Kudryavtsev
 Heat – 3:57.07 (→ did not advance, 22nd place)

Men's 1500 m Freestyle
 Viktor Andreyev
 Heat – 15:21.43
 Final – 15:33.94 (→ 8th place)

Men's 100 m Backstroke
 Vladimir Selkov
 Heat – 55.72
 Final – 55.49 (→ 5th place)

Men's 200 m Backstroke
 Vladimir Selkov
 Heat – 1:59.81
 Final – 1:58.87 (→  Silver Medal)

Men's 100 m Breaststroke
 Vasily Ivanov
 Heat – 1:01.91
 Final – 1:01.87 (→ 5th place)
 Dmitri Volkov
 Heat – 1:01.74
 Final – 1:02.07 (→ 6th place)

Men's 200 m Breaststroke
 Aleksandr Savitsky
 Heat – 2:24.58 (→ did not advance, 38th place)

Men's 100 m Butterfly
 Pavel Khnykin
 Heat – 54.02
 Final – 53.81 (→ 4th place)
 Vladislav Kulikov
 Heat – 54.23
 Final – 54.26 (→ 8th place)

Men's 200 m Butterfly
 Denis Pankratov
 Heat – 1:59.00
 Final – 1:58.98 (→ 6th place)

Men's 200 m Individual Medley
 Serghei Mariniuc
 Heat – 2:04.23
 B-Final – 2:03.72 (→ 10th place)
 Aleksandr Savitsky
 Heat – 2:05.09 (→ did not advance, 19th place)

Men's 400 m Individual Medley
 Serghei Mariniuc
 Heat – 4:19.05
 Final – 4:22.93 (→ 7th place)

Men's 4 × 100 m Freestyle Relay
 Pavel Khnykin, Yuriy Bashkatov, Vladimir Pyshnenko, and Venyamin Tayanovich
 Heat – 3:17.48
 Pavel Khnykin, Gennadiy Prigoda, Yuriy Bashkatov, and Alexander Popov
 Final – 3:17.56 (→  Silver Medal)

Men's 4 × 200 m Freestyle Relay
 Dmitry Lepikov, Aleksey Kudryavtsev, Yury Mukhin, and Veniamin Tayanovich
 Heat – 7:17.65
 Dmitry Lepikov, Vladimir Pyshnenko, Veniamin Tayanovich, and Yevgeny Sadovyi
 Final – 7:11.95 (→ WR and  Gold Medal)

Men's 4 × 100 m Medley Relay
 Pavel Khnykin, Dmitri Volkov, Vladislav Kulikov, and Vladimir Pyshnenko
 Heat – 3:42.22
 Vladimir Selkov, Vasily Ivanov, Pavel Khnykin, and Alexander Popov
 Final – 3:38.56 (→  Silver Medal)

Women's 50 m Freestyle
 Natalya Meshcheryakova
 Heat – 25.89
 Final – 25.47 (→ 6th place)
 Yevgenia Yermakova
 Heat – 26.45
 B-Final – 26.49 (→ 14th place)

Women's 100 m Freestyle
 Yelena Choubina
 Heat – 56.31
 B-Final – 56.19 (→ 11th place)
 Yevgenia Yermakova
 Heat – 56.67
 B-Final – 56.66 (→ 14th place)

Women's 200 m Freestyle
 Olga Kirichenko
 Heat – 2:00.67
 Final – 2:00.90 (→ 7th place)
 Yelena Dendeberova
 Heat – 2:01.28
 B-Final – 2:00.09 (→ 9th place)

Women's 100 m Backstroke
 Nina Zhivanevskaya
 Heat – 1:02.25
 Final – 1:02.36 (→ 7th place)
 Natalia Chibaeva
 Heat – 1:05.08 (→ did not advance, 26th place)

Women's 200 m Backstroke
 Nina Zhivanevskaya
 Heat – 2:14.34
 Final – 2:17.61 (→ 14th place)
 Natalia Chibaeva
 Heat – 2:20.52 (→ did not advance, 33rd place)

Women's 100 m Breaststroke
 Elena Roudkovskaya
 Heat – 1:08.75
 Final – 1:08.00 (→  Gold Medal)
 Yelena Volkova
 Heat – 1:12.46 (→ did not advance, 20th place)

Women's 200 m Breaststroke
 Elena Roudkovskaya
 Heat – 2:28.24
 Final – 2:28.47 (→ 4th place)
 Yelena Volkova
 Heat – 2:32.39
 B-Final – 2:37.65 (→ 16th place)

Women's 100 m Butterfly
 Olga Kirichenko
 Heat – 1:01.78
 B-Final – DNS (→ no ranking)
 Natalia Yacovleva
 Heat – 1:03.18 (→ did not advance, 29th place)

Women's 200 m Butterfly
 Natalia Yacovleva
 Heat – 2:19.02 (→ did not advance, 22nd place)

Women's 200 m Individual Medley
 Yelena Dendeberova
 Heat – 2:17.13
 Final – 2:15.47 (→ 4th place)

Women's 4 × 100 m Freestyle Relay
 Natalya Meshcheryakova, Svetlana Leshukova, Yelena Dendeberova, and Yevgenia Yermakova
 Heat – 3:45.06
 Natalya Meshcheryakova, Svetlana Leshukova, Yelena Dendeberova, and Yelena Choubina
 Final – 3:43.68 (→ 4th place)

Women's 4 × 100 m Medley Relay
 Nina Zhivanevskaya, Elena Roudkovskaya, Olga Kirichenko, and Yelena Choubina
 Heat – 4:10.37
 Nina Zhivanevskaya, Elena Roudkovskaya, Olga Kirichenko, and Natalya Meshcheryakova
 Final – 4:06.44 (→  Bronze Medal)

Synchronized swimming

Three synchronized swimmers represented the Unified Team in 1992.

 Women's solo
 Olga Sedakova
 Anna Kozlova
 Yelena Dolzhenko

 Women's duet
 Olga Sedakova
 Anna Kozlova

Table tennis

Tennis

Men's Singles Competition

Women's Singles Competition

Volleyball

Women's Team Competition
 Preliminary round (group B)
 Defeated Spain (3–0)
 Lost to United States (2-3)
 Defeated Japan (3–0)
 Semifinals
 Defeated Brazil (3–1)
 Final
 Lost to Cuba (1–3) →  Silver Medal

 Team roster
 Valentina Ogienko
 Natalya Morozova
 Marina Nikoulina
 Elena Tyurina
 Irina Smirnova
 Tatyana Sidorenko
 Tatyana Menchova
 Evgenya Artamonova
 Galina Lebedeva
 Svetlana Vassilevskaya
 Yelena Tcheboukina
 Svetlana Koritova

Water polo

Men's team competition
 Team roster
 Dmitry Apanasenko
 Andrey Belofastov
 Yevgeny Sharonov
 Dmitry Gorshkov
 Vladimir Karabutov
 Aleksandr Kolotov
 Andriy Kovalenko
 Nikolay Kozlov
 Sergey Markoch
 Sergey Naumov
 Aleksandr Ogorodnikov
 Aleksandr Chigir
 Aleksey Vdovin

Weightlifting

Weightlifting events, results, and competitors:

 Men's Lightweight (– 67.5 kg)
 Israel Militosyan – 1st place ( Gold medal)

 Men's Middleweight (– 75 kg)
 Tudor Casapu – 1st place ( Gold medal)

 Men's Light-Heavyweight (– 82.5 kg)
 Ibragim Samadov

 Men's Middle-Heavyweight (– 90 kg)
 Akakios Kakiasvili – 1st place ( Gold medal)
 Sergey Syrtsov – 2nd place ( Silver medal)

 Men's Heavyweight I (– 100 kg)
 Viktor Tregubov – 1st place ( Gold medal)
 Tymur Taimazov – 2nd place ( Silver medal)

 Men's Heavyweight II (– 110 kg)
 Artur Akoyev – 2nd place ( Silver medal)

 Men's Super-Heavyweight (+110 kg)
 Aleksandr Kurlovich – 1st place ( Gold medal)
 Leonid Taranenko – 2nd place ( Silver medal)

Wrestling

Wrestling events (Freestyle and Greco-Roman), results, and competitors:

Freestyle 
 Men's freestyle 48 kg (light-flyweight)
 Vugar Orujov – 3rd place ( Bronze medal)

 Men's freestyle 52 kg (flyweight)
 Volodymyr Tohuzov

 Men's freestyle 57 kg (bantamweight)
 Sergey Smal – 2nd place ( Silver medal)

 Men's freestyle 62 kg (featherweight)
 Magomed Azizov – 5th place

 Men's freestyle 68 kg (lightweight)
 Arsen Fadzayev – 1st place ( Gold medal)

 Men's freestyle 74 kg (welterweight)
 Magomedsalam Gadzhiev– 4th place

 Men's freestyle 82 kg (middleweight)
 Elmadi Jabrailov – 2nd place ( Silver medal)

 Men's freestyle 90 kg (light-heavyweight)
 Makharbek Khadartsev – 1st place ( Gold medal)

 Men's freestyle 100 kg (heavyweight)
 Leri Khabelov – 1st place ( Gold medal)

 Men's freestyle 130 kg (super-heavyweight)
 David Gobezhishvili – 3rd place ( Bronze medal)

Greco-Roman 
 Men's Greco-Roman 48 kg (light-flyweight)
 Oleg Kucherenko – 1st place ( Gold medal)

 Men's Greco-Roman 52 kg (flyweight)
 Alfred Ter-Mkrtychyan – 2nd place ( Silver medal)

 Men's Greco-Roman 57 kg (bantamweight)
 Aleksandr Ignatenko – 4th place

 Men's Greco-Roman 62 kg (featherweight)
 Sergey Martynov – 2nd place ( Silver medal)

 Men's Greco-Roman 68 kg (lightweight)
 Islam Dugushiev – 2nd place ( Silver medal)

 Men's Greco-Roman 74 kg (welterweight)
 Mnatsakan Iskandaryan – 1st place ( Gold medal)

 Men's Greco-Roman 82 kg (middleweight)
 Daulet Turlykhanov – 3rd place ( Bronze medal)

 Men's Greco-Roman 90 kg (light-heavyweight)
 Gogi Koguashvili – 3rd place ( Bronze medal)

 Men's Greco-Roman 100 kg (heavyweight)
 Sergey Demyashkevich – 3rd place ( Bronze medal)

 Men's Greco-Roman 130 kg (super-heavyweight)
 Aleksandr Karelin – 1st place ( Gold medal)

References

Nations at the 1992 Summer Olympics
1992
1992 in Armenian sport
1992 in Azerbaijani sport
1992 in Belarusian sport
1992 in Georgian sport
1992 in Kazakhstani sport
1992 in Kyrgyzstani sport
1992 in Moldovan sport
1992 in Russian sport
1992 in Tajikistani sport
1992 in Turkmenistani sport
1992 in Ukrainian sport
1992 in Uzbekistani sport